Alfred Sapecky (February 7, 1913 – February 28, 1999) was an American rower. He competed in the men's coxless four at the 1936 Summer Olympics.

References

External links
 
 

1913 births
1999 deaths
American male rowers
Olympic rowers of the United States
Rowers at the 1936 Summer Olympics
Sportspeople from New York City